Rated R is a 2008 Spanish film directed and written by Félix Sabroso and Dunia Ayaso which stars Candela Peña, Mar Flores, and Goya Toledo.

Plot 
The plot, starting in Madrid in 1975, follows Sandra, Lina and Eva, three actresses with different backgrounds working in Cine 'S' (erotic films) productions during the so-called Transition.

Cast 

Susana Estrada features in a cameo.

Production 
The film was produced by The Little Jiraffe and Antena 3 Films and it had the participation of Antena 3.

Release 
Distributed by Universal Pictures International Spain, the film was theatrically released in Spain on 24 October 2008.

Reception 
Jonathan Holland of Variety deemed the film to be "an affectionate, if clumsy, X-ray of the period" [immediately after the death of dictator Franco] in which the sinking soap-opera-like final stretch is compensated by a trio of strong performances and "the sheer fascination of watching a decent portrayal of a society in transition".

Mirito Torreiro of Fotogramas rated the film 3 out of 5 stars, highlighting an "impeccable lead trio" as the best thing about the film, while citing an "improvable screenplay" as a negative point.

See also 
 List of Spanish films of 2008

References 

2000s Spanish-language films
2008 films
Films set in 1975
Films set in Madrid
Atresmedia Cine films
Films about actors
2000s Spanish films
Films about the Spanish Transition